is a town located in Sōya Subprefecture, Hokkaido, Japan. It contains the Sarobetsu Plain, which is part of Rishiri-Rebun-Sarobetsu National Park, and is famous for its hot springs.

As of September 2016, the town has an estimated population of 4,054 and a density of 7.8 persons per km². The total area is 520.69 km².

History

Origin of the town's name 
It is derived from the name "Ebekorobetsu" of the region now referred to as the Shimo-Ebekorobetsu River Valley. In Ainu, the name Ebekorobetsu (ipe-kor-pet) means "a river containing fish (food)". Because the area is rich in natural resources such as coal, petroleum, peat, and hot springs, it was named Toyotomi, which is an alternate reading of the Chinese characters for the word houfu (豊富), meaning "rich" or "abundant".

Timeline 
 1869 - Japanese settlement offices open.
 1878 - The village of Saru is founded in the location of present-day Toyotomi.
 1909 - A government registration office is opened in the village of Horonobe, which included present-day Toyotomi.
 1919 - The villages of Horonobe and Saru are incorporated into one village.
 1926 - Natural gas and hot springs are discovered during mining at the present-day location of Toyotomi Onsen.
 1936 November - The Nissō Coal Mine of Teshio is opened by Nippon Soda Co., Ltd. 
 1940 September - The village of Horonobe is separated into the villages of Horonobe and Toyotomi 
 1947 - Mitsubishi Materials begins coal-mining operations in the Toyotomi-Horonobe area. 
 1948 October - The town is moved from the administration of Rumoi Subprefecture to that of Sōya Subprefecture. 
 1950 November - The areas of Tenkō and Akebono become part of Wakkanai. 
 1959 January - Toyotomi is officially designated a township under Japanese municipal laws. 
 1972 July - Nissō Coal Mine closes. 
 1974 September - The Sarobetsu Plain is designated a national park. 
 1991 July - The town becomes the first in the country to proclaim itself a "Bicycle for Health Town". 
 2002 December - Garbage disposal fees are instituted. 
 2005 November - The Sarobetsu Plain is designated a Ramsar site.

Geography 
The Sarobetsu Plain covers the coastal side of the Sarobetsu River Valley. The area to the east of Japan National Route 40 is filled with gently sloping hills and mountains, as well as farmland and forests. Toyotomi Onsen is located in the mountainous region to the southeast. 
 Rivers: Sarobetsu River, Shimo-Ebekorobetsu River
 Lakes: Kabutonuma Marsh, Penkenuma Marsh, Naganuma Marshes
 Mountains: Toryū Pass

Climate

Economy

Industries

Farming 
Toyotomi has a prosperous dairy industry. The area is home to over 16,000 dairy cows, meaning that the bovine population in Toyotomi is four times greater than that of the town's human population. Each year 72,000 tons of dairy milk are produced in the town, making it the largest dairy producer in Hokkaidō. Sold under the brand name of Hokkaido Sarobetsu Milk (formerly Hokkaido Toyotomi Milk), the milk produced in Toyotomi is widely consumed throughout Hokkaido. The town actively recruits and trains young people interested in becoming farmers.

In recent years, businesses that produce and sell high quality food products have been growing in Toyotomi, such as Misawa Farm, which produces LTLT pasteurized-milk, Kōbō Retie, which creates authentic dairy products such as cheese and gelato, and Sarobetsu Farm, which makes ham and sausages.

Forestry 
With forestland covering 52% of the town's total area, forestry is a key industry in Toyotomi. Through the implementation of the Toyotomi Forest Maintenance Plan, the town systematically preserves and maintains its forests.

Tourism 
Facing a decline in population following the closing of its coal mines, the town decided to change its focus to the tourism industry. Over 30,000 people visit Toyotomi for tourism each year.

Toyotomi's main tourist attraction is Japan's northernmost onsen, Toyotomi Onsen. Because the water from the onsen is considered to help with the treatment of skin disease, many skin disease sufferers seeking to heal their skin as well as tourists visit the onsen each year.

The town is home to the Sarobetsu Plain, and opportunities for coming into contact with nature are plentiful. In recent years, with the recognition of the town's vast farmlands as a source of tourism, farm restaurants and the sale of high quality dairy products have been increasing.

Mining 
In the past, Toyotomi had a prosperous mining industry, in which coal, petroleum, and natural gas were produced. However, due to the decline in profitability of coal mining, Toyotomi's coal mines have since closed. The amount of petroleum buried in the area is not great enough to justify extraction operations. Natural gas emerges in the area, and in the past it was used to generate electricity which was used in Wakkanai, but due to the aging of the equipment involved and profitability issues, plant operations ceased in 1975. Currently, natural gas is still used to heat the water at Toyotomi Onsen.

Fishing 
Wakasakanai Harbor is famous for the hokkigai which are caught there.

Mascot

He is a simple and cute young calf. He was unveiled in 1989.

References

External links
 
 Official Website 

Towns in Hokkaido